High Representative may refer to either:
 The High Representative of the Union for Foreign Affairs and Security Policy, the head of European Union foreign policy
 The High Representative for Bosnia and Herzegovina, the United Nations delegate charged with overseeing the implementation of the Dayton agreement in Bosnia and Herzegovina
 A proposed US appointed administrator for Afghanistan
 High Representative for the United Nations Alliance of Civilizations
 High Representative for Disarmament Affairs

See also:
 High Commissioner
 Special Representative